Pierre Boya (born 16 January 1984) is a Cameroonian professional footballer who plays as a striker.

Club career
On 10 November 2003, Boya signed a four-year contract with Partizan. He scored a goal on his debut for the club two weeks later in a 3–1 home league victory over Radnički Obrenovac. The highlight of his career at Partizan was during the 2004–05 UEFA Cup group stage, when Boya scored both goals for his team in their 2–2 away draw with Lazio. He was eventually unable to find the back of the net for a year and a half. In the meantime, Boya failed to convert a penalty in the shootout versus Artmedia Bratislava in the return leg of the 2005–06 UEFA Champions League third qualifying round that would have qualified Partizan for the group stage. He finally ended his goal drought on 8 April 2006, netting a brace in a 3–1 away league win against Voždovac.

In the summer of 2007, Boya moved to Rapid București on a free transfer. He scored seven goals in 21 league appearances in his first season at the club. After the departure of Mugurel Buga, Ionuț Mazilu and Lucian Burdujan in the summer of 2008, Boya was considered as the club's main attacking option. He was eventually transferred to Grenoble in the 2009 winter transfer window.

On 31 August 2010, Boya returned to Partizan and signed a one-and-a-half-year deal, after the club qualified for the 2010–11 UEFA Champions League group stage. He marked his second debut for the club by scoring two goals and providing an assist after coming on as a substitute in a 3–0 home league win over Rad on 11 September 2010. Eventually, Boya left Partizan during the 2011 winter transfer window, after a disagreement with the club's board.

In late 2011, Boya moved to Austria and joined First League side Austria Lustenau, but was unable to play until the expiration of his contract with Partizan. He debuted for the club in the second half of the 2011–12 season, scoring 10 goals in his first eight league matches. In August 2012, Boya was  transferred to Danish club Randers for the rest of the 2012–13 season. He signed with Albanian club Kukësi during the 2013–14 season.

On 6 August 2014, Boya joined I-League side Mohun Bagan. He officially signed as their marquee player three days later and was registered with the number 43 shirt. Boya made 15 appearances and scored two goals for the club during the campaign, as they won the title.

In spring 2016, Boya spent some time on trial at Persija Jakarta, but failed to get a contract.

International career
Between 2005 and 2007, Boya made four appearances for the national team of Cameroon and scored one goal. He also represented his country at the 2006 Africa Cup of Nations.

Career statistics

Honours
Partizan
 First League of Serbia and Montenegro: 2004–05
Mohun Bagan
 I-League: 2014–15
Individual
Jigme Dorji Wangchuk Memorial Gold Cup Top scorer: 2014

References

External links
 
 
 

2006 Africa Cup of Nations players
Kategoria Superiore players
Association football forwards
2. Liga (Austria) players
Cameroon international footballers
Cameroonian expatriate footballers
Cameroonian expatriate sportspeople in Albania
Cameroonian expatriate sportspeople in Austria
Cameroonian expatriate sportspeople in Denmark
Cameroonian expatriate sportspeople in France
Cameroonian expatriate sportspeople in India
Cameroonian expatriate sportspeople in Romania
Cameroonian expatriate sportspeople in Serbia
Cameroonian footballers
Championnat National 3 players
Danish Superliga players
Expatriate footballers in Albania
Expatriate footballers in Austria
Expatriate men's footballers in Denmark
Expatriate footballers in France
Expatriate footballers in India
Expatriate footballers in Romania
Expatriate footballers in Serbia
Expatriate footballers in Serbia and Montenegro
FC Rapid București players
First League of Serbia and Montenegro players
FK Kukësi players
FK Partizan players
Grenoble Foot 38 players
I-League players
Liga I players
Ligue 1 players
Mohun Bagan AC players
Randers FC players
SC Austria Lustenau players
Serbian SuperLiga players
Footballers from Yaoundé
1984 births
Living people
Cameroonian expatriate sportspeople in Lebanon
Expatriate footballers in Lebanon
Salam Zgharta FC players
Lebanese Premier League players